The 1997 Monmouth Hawks football team represented Monmouth University in the 1997 NCAA Division I-AA football season as a member of the Northeast Conference (NEC). The Hawks were led by fifth-year head coach Kevin Callahan and played their home games at Kessler Field. They finished the season 5–4 overall and 3–1 in NEC play to place second.

Schedule

References

Monmouth
Monmouth Hawks football seasons
Monmouth Hawks football